Zelia gracilis is a species of bristle fly in the family Tachinidae.

Distribution
United States

References

Dexiinae
Insects described in 1946
Diptera of North America